Oluwatobiloba Daniel Anidugbe (born 1 May 1994), better known by his stage name Kizz Daniel, is a Nigerian singer and songwriter. He rose to fame in 2014 with his debut single, "Woju". He went by the stage name Kiss Daniel prior to changing it in May 2018. He signed a record deal with G-Worldwide Entertainment in 2013, but left the label following a publicized contract dispute and court case. He founded the Fly Boy Inc record label in November 2017.

On 8 August 2022, Kizz Daniel was arrested in Dar es Salaam by the Tanzanian police force over failure to perform.

On 3 February 2023, he was announced by Audiomack alongside Snazzy the Optimist, Asake and 1ucid as the top trending and most streamed artistes.

Early life and education 
Kizz Daniel was born as Oluwatobiloba Daniel Anidugbe in Abeokuta, Ogun State, Nigeria. He hails from Abeokuta North local government area. He attended Abeokuta Grammar School and graduated from Federal University of Agriculture, Abeokuta, in 2013, with a degree in Water Resources Management and Agrometeorology (Water Engineering). While in university, he decided to pursue music as a career alongside his studies.

Career
In May 2015, Kizz Daniel released a third follow up single, “Laye,” on his birthday, along with a video two weeks later which was shot in different locations in the eastern part of Africa and was directed by AJE FILMS. Daniel released his first studio album titled New Era on May 14, 2016.

After his exit from his former label G-WorldWide, he went to float his own personal imprint FLYBOY I.N.C. which recently signed two new acts Demmie Vee and Philkeyz. After which Kizz Daniel was featured on Demmie Vee single entitled "You Go Wait?". 2018 was sure a good year for the WOJU crooner, he featured Wizkid on a Hit Song "FOR YOU" and Davido on another single "One Ticket" which hit the charts within 24hrs of its release. On the 30th of December 2018, Kizz Daniel released his 2nd Studio album and his first under FlyBoy Inc titled "No Bad Songz". The album contained 20 Songs including the pre-released One Ticket which he featured Davido. Other features on the Album included Nasty C, Diamond Platiumz, Philkeyz, Demmie Vee, Dj Xclusive, Wretch 32, Diplo and Sarkodie. The album received positive reviews from music lovers, it debuted at No 55 on the US iTunes Chart and became number 1 on the world Album Chart within 24 hours of its release. On 25 June 2020, he released his third studio album 'King of Love'

In 2017, many of his fans thought he would make a career switch to comedy as he was uploading comedy skits. However he said he has no intention of switching to comedy as music is his main talent.

For the 2022 FIFA World Cup in Qatar, Kizz Daniel will perform his hit single ‘Buga’ at the 2022 FIFA World Cup in Qatar, he has expressed his desire to perform at the FIFA World Cup, which is set to start on November 20, 2022, shared an update on whether he would be appearing at the world's biggest footballing event.

He acquired a new house and announced it in September 2022, According to his own statements, he always wanted a house on the water for his wife and children which he claims will soon be possible.

He recently released a new song called "Cough (Odo)" produced by Blaise Beatz, this is Kizz Daniel's second official release of the year 2022.

Record label dispute and name change
In November 2017, Kizz Daniel announced his split from his record label, G-Worldwide, and created his own label called FLYBOY I.N.C. He was sued to court by the former record label but was not found guilty for any of the crimes he was accused of.

In May 2018, Kizz Daniel announced that he had changed his stage name from Kiss Daniel to Kizz Daniel, a name that immediately reflected on his social media accounts. New Spotify and Apple Music accounts were also created immediately with the name Kizz Daniel, with his new songs featured.

In June 2018, Kizz Daniel's former record label G-Worldwide made a move to own the rights to the name “Kizz Daniel” and further advised the singer to desist from using the name or face legal consequences in a press release sent out to media houses. In October 2018  Daniel responded to the suit and statement made by his former record label G-Worldwide through his own lawyer. On 8 April 2022, Emperor Geezy and Daniel settled their disputes, outside the court in a viral video tagged #Peace&Love.

On February 2023, Kizz Daniel won the Song of the Year award at the Soundcity MVP Awards which were held at the Eko Convention Centre in Lagos with Buga.

Buga 
On May 4, 2022, he released a chart-topping single titled Buga The song became a hit with dance challenges on Instagram and TikTok with prominent people including the President of Liberia, George Weah dancing to it.

Personal life 
On May 1, 2021, he welcomed a set of triplets, Jamal, Jalil, and Jelani, with his mysterious girlfriend. Kizz later revealed how he lost one of his triplets, Jamal, just four days after birth as he acquired a two-bedroom penthouse each for Jalil and Jelani.

Discography
Studio albums and EPs
New Era (2016)
No Bad Songz (2018)
King of Love (2020)
Barnabas (2021)

Awards and nominations

References 
47. Stream Kizz Daniel – Rich Till I Die (RTID) full song

21st-century Nigerian male singers
Living people
Federal University of Agriculture, Abeokuta alumni
Musicians from Ogun State
Nigerian singer-songwriters
Yoruba musicians
1994 births
Age controversies